"Face to Face" is a song by French electronic music duo Daft Punk, featuring vocals and co-production by American house music producer Todd Edwards. It was released as the fifth single from their 2001 album Discovery. Promotional 12" singles were released for those who pre-ordered the 2003 remix album Daft Club, and a CD single containing a remix of the song by French producer Demon was released commercially. As part of Discovery, the song appears in the film Interstella 5555: The 5tory of the 5ecret 5tar 5ystem, and the section of the film in which the song appears serves as its music video. The song topped the Billboard Hot Dance Club Play chart in 2004.

Background
"Face to Face" was co-produced, co-written and features a vocal performance by American house music producer Todd Edwards. Daft Punk considered Edwards to be one of the biggest influences on their work, and were delighted at the opportunity to collaborate with him. The duo initially wanted to work with him on Daft Punk's debut album Homework, but had difficulty convincing Edwards as the two were not as well known at the time.

Production took place in New York and New Jersey as well as in Paris. When it came time to record the vocals, the duo directed Edwards to "sing a little raspier, like Foreigner". The completed song contains Edwards' first two vocal takes, layered to create a doubling effect. Thomas Bangalter of the duo stated: "Todd Edwards sings sometimes but not like that. I think we were all very excited and surprised by the way he could sing this song."

The duo expressed gratitude in working with Edwards, and stated that after they did so, "we [Daft Punk] are free to explore other areas. It will be interesting to see what we'll do next. Now we can work with other people." Daft Punk would later reunite with Edwards for the song "Fragments of Time", from their 2013 album Random Access Memories. Edwards also noted that despite his success in the garage house scene, he is occasionally greeted with surprise and praise for being the singer in "Face to Face".

Composition

"Face to Face" is composed in a common time of 4/4, with a tempo of 118 BPM in the key of G-sharp minor. The song features Edwards' signature "cut-up" production style of editing samples and creating spaces in between segments to create a rhythmic, "futuristic" effect. Edwards recalled that he and Daft Punk each culled together "70 samples" to edit into the song. The title phrase was initially conveyed as scrambled audio resembling the words "face to face".

The song was conceived to accompany a live-action scene of a film, in which a climactic battle is revealed to be between the protagonist and their reflection in a mirror. With that in mind, Edwards set to write lyrics that could be sung either to another person, to one's own mirror image, or to God.  In the context of the album, Bangalter noted that the preceding track "Short Circuit" represented the act of shutting down, "and [afterwards] you regain consciousness and you are more face to face with reality". Though the live-action element was abandoned, the concept of setting Discovery songs to a feature film would later materialize as Interstella 5555.

Music video
"Face to Face" is featured in the 2003 animated film Interstella 5555: The 5tory of the 5ecret 5tar 5ystem, which acts as a visual realization of Discovery. The film was directed by Kazuhisa Takenouchi under the visual supervision of Leiji Matsumoto. The "Face to Face" segment follows the aftermath of the extraterrestrial pop band The Crescendolls seemingly subduing the villain, Earl de Darkwood, at his Manor. Construction crews unearth the space vessel that had been piloted by Shep; he had rescued the band from enslavement and brainwashing by Darkwood, who had taken on the guise being of their manager. Police investigate the Record company the band had been signed to, and search every part of Darkwood Manor. A news report depicts montage scenes of an operation to send The Crescendolls back to their home planet using Shep's ship. The report also explains the situation and shows that The Crescendolls were not the only group to have this happen to them. One of the band members, Octave is shown in a hospital having recovered from an earlier altercation with security guards at the Record company. As the band prepares to leave Earth, people wave goodbye to the band from all over the world.

Formats and track listings

Charts

See also
 List of number-one dance singles of 2004 (U.S.)

References

External links
 Daft Punk official site
 Virgin Records Daft Punk official site

2001 songs
2003 singles
Animated music videos
Daft Punk songs
Todd Edwards songs
Songs written by Guy-Manuel de Homem-Christo
Songs written by Thomas Bangalter
Virgin Records singles